Phytorellus is a genus of leaf beetles in the subfamily Eumolpinae, known from the Philippines.

Species
 Phytorellus gibbosus (Lefèvre, 1885)
 Phytorellus latus (Weise, 1910)
 Phytorellus latus latus (Weise, 1910)
 Phytorellus latus mindorensis Medvedev & Moseyko, 2003

References

Eumolpinae
Chrysomelidae genera
Beetles of Asia
Insects of the Philippines